Shade Gap is a borough in Huntingdon County, Pennsylvania, United States. The population was 105 at the 2010 census.

Geography

Shade Gap is located in southeastern Huntingdon County at  (40.180107, -77.865434). It sits at the eastern base of Shade Mountain just south of that mountain's water gap where Shade Creek passes through.

U.S. Route 522 passes just east of the borough, leading north  to Mount Union and south  to Interstate 76 near Fort Littleton. Pennsylvania Route 35 runs northeast along the base of Shade Mountain  to Mifflin, and Pennsylvania Route 641 leads southeast over Tuscarora Mountain  to Spring Run.

Demographics

At the 2000 census, there were 97 people, 38 households, and 25 families residing in the borough. The population density was 2,103.7 people per square mile (749.0/km²). There were 43 housing units at an average density of 932.6 per square mile (332.0/km²).  The racial makeup of the borough was 97.94% White and 2.06% African American.
There were 38 households, 31.6% had children under the age of 18 living with them, 52.6% were married couples living together, 10.5% had a female householder with no husband present, and 34.2% were non-families. 28.9% of households were made up of individuals, and 18.4% were one person aged 65 or older. The average household size was 2.55 and the average family size was 3.08.

In the borough, the population was spread out, with 25.8% under the age of 18, 5.2% from 18 to 24, 30.9% from 25 to 44, 19.6% from 45 to 64, and 18.6% 65 or older. The median age was 36 years. For every 100 females there were 86.5 males. For every 100 females age 18 and over, there were 84.6 males.

The median income for a household in the borough was $18,125, and the median family income  was $23,438. Males had a median income of $23,125 versus $15,000 for females. The per capita income for the borough was $9,557. There were 13.0% of families and 19.5% of the population living below the poverty line, including 20.0% of under eighteens and 10.7% of those over 64.

See also
Kidnapping of Peggy Ann Bradnick

References

1871 establishments in Pennsylvania
Boroughs in Huntingdon County, Pennsylvania
Populated places established in 1871